Sørheim is a surname. Notable people with the surname include:

Atle Ørbeck Sørheim (born 1933), Norwegian veterinarian and civil servant
Gøran Sørheim (born 1990), Norwegian handball player 
Ingjald Ørbeck Sørheim (1937–2010), Norwegian jurist and politician
Kari Sørheim (born 1948), Norwegian politician
Thor Sørheim (born 1949), Norwegian author

Norwegian-language surnames